Capital Breakfast with Roman Kemp is a British national breakfast radio show on Capital. The show is broadcast from 6am to 10am each weekday. From 7 January 2012 an additional live networked edition was broadcast from 6am to 9am each Saturday.

A national version of the programme began on 8 April 2019 forcing the local variations across the UK to be axed. Those local versions were Dino, Pete & Tyles (Capital East Midlands), Jono & Emma (Capital South Coast), Adam & JoJo (Capital Yorkshire), Rob & Matilda (Capital Birmingham), Matt & Polly (Capital South Wales), Bodg, Matt & Hannah (Capital North East), The Rob Ellis Show (Capital Manchester), Des Clarke, Steven & Amy (Capital Scotland), Ben Sheppard (Capital North West and Wales), Adam, Gemma & Dylan (Capital Liverpool) and Dave and Miranda (Capital Brighton). Only Capital Cymru retained their own local shows.

Broadcast and production
As Capital London (channel listed as Capital FM) is simulcast on TV variants which are available on Freesat, Freeview, Sky, TalkTalk TV and Virgin Media, Capital Breakfast is available throughout the UK. This variant is produced at their studios in Leicester Square, London.

On air team
The longest running presenter was Chris Tarrant, who presented the show from 1987 to 2004. Tarrant won the Sony Radio Academy Awards, Breakfast Show Gold in 1995 for this show. Previous Breakfast Show presenters from 1973 were David Symonds, Kenny Everett & Dave Cash, Everett on his own, Mike Smith and Graham Dene.

In April 2004, Johnny Vaughan replaced Tarrant, as the presenter of Capital Breakfast. In 2008, he was joined by Lisa Snowdon. Vaughan left the programme in November 2011 after being told that his contract was not being renewed, and was replaced with Dave Berry.

In February 2011 it was reported the show remained London's most listened to commercial breakfast show with Capital London having more than one million listeners between 6am and 10am.

In February 2016, following Lisa Snowdon's departure, It was announced that George Shelley and Lilah Parsons would join Dave Berry as co-presenters.

In February 2017, It was announced that Dave Berry to leave Capital to host his own show on Absolute Radio.

In April 2017, Dave Berry left Capital. Following that it was announced that George Shelley and Lilah Parsons would leave Capital Breakfast, a Capital spokesperson said they’ll appear elsewhere on the schedule.

On 18 April 2017, it was announced that Roman Kemp would host the show alongside Vick Hope, a new presenter. They started on 2 May 2017. A year later Sonny Jay joined the show full-time. On 24 February 2020, it was announced that Hope had left Capital Breakfast to focus on new TV opportunities.

It was announced that presenter Siân Welby would replace Hope, starting 23 March 2020.

In 2022, It was announced that Chris Stark would join the team. His first show was on October 10, 2022.

On December 15, 2022, Sonny Jay announced that he would be leaving the show to present "The Capital Late Show” which was previously hosted by Marvin Humes. He began on January 3, 2023.

Lead presenter
Roman Kemp (2017–present)

Co-starring
Siân Welby (2020–present)
Chris Stark (2022–present)

Former notable presenters

Main presenters
Kenny Everett (1974–1975)
Graham Dene (1975–1980, 1982–1987)
Mike Smith (1980–1982)
Chris Tarrant (1987–2004)
Neil Fox deputised for Chris Tarrant (1988–2003)
Johnny Vaughan (2004–2011)

Rich Clarke (stand-in presenter, 2009)
Dave Berry (2012–2017)
Lilah Parsons (2016–2017)
George Shelley (2016–2017)
Vick Hope (2017–2020)
Sonny Jay (2018–2022)

Co-presenters
Caroline Feraday co-presenter with Neil Fox when deputising for Chris Tarrant (1995–2001)
Becky Jago (200304)
Denise van Outen (2008)
Lisa Snowdon (2009–2015). Replacing Denise Van Outen. Left 18 December 2015.
Paddy Bunce (Sports reporter when Johnny Vaughan presented the programme)
Dominic Byrne (newsreader, 2013–2014)

References

External links
Capital London
Capital Breakfast With Roman Kemp

British comedy radio programmes
Capital (radio network)